Andreas Constantinou (born October 12, 1980) is a Cypriot football defender who last played for Enosis Neon Paralimni. He was a member of Cyprus national team.

Constantinou started his career in AC Omonia. He also played for Alki Larnaca and AEK Larnaca. He medially played again in AC Omonia. In June 2007, he signed a two-year deal with Anorthosis. Anorthosis released the player in 2010, and on 25 August he signed a contract with Alki Larnaca FC.

References

External links
 

Living people
1980 births
Cypriot footballers
Sportspeople from Nicosia
Cyprus international footballers
Association football defenders
AC Omonia players
Alki Larnaca FC players
AEK Larnaca FC players
Anorthosis Famagusta F.C. players
Enosis Neon Paralimni FC players